KTCY may refer to:

 KTCY (FM), a radio station (105.3 FM) licensed to serve Menard, Texas, United States
 KYDA, a radio station (101.7 FM) licensed to serve Azle, Texas, which held the call sign KTCY from 2003 to 2013
 KZMP-FM, a radio station (104.9 FM) licensed to serve Pilot Point, Texas, which held the call sign KTCY from 1990 to 2003
 Tracy Municipal Airport (California) (ICAO code KTCY)